Afraflacilla altera is a species of jumping spider in the genus Afraflacilla that lives in South Africa and Zimbabwe. It was first described in 2000 by Wanda Wesołowska. The species was initially placed in the genus Pseudicius but was transferred in 2017. It is related to Afraflacilla venustula.

References

Salticidae
Arthropods of Zimbabwe
Spiders described in 2000
Spiders of South Africa
Taxa named by Wanda Wesołowska